The R.550 Magic (backronym for Missile Auto-Guidé Interception et Combat) is a short-range air-to-air missile designed in 1968 by French company Matra to compete with the American AIM-9 Sidewinder, and it was made backwards compatible with the Sidewinder launch hardware.

Development 

On 11 January 1972, a Gloster Meteor of the centre for in-flight trials fired an R550 Magic and shot down a Nord CT20 target drone (unmanned aerial vehicle).

Mass-produced from 1976, the Magic was adopted by the French Air Force and Navy.

The Argentine Air Force received "Magic 1" for its Mirage IIIEA during the 1982 Falklands War.

The Argentine Navy received "Magic 1" for its Super Etendards after the 1982 Falklands War.

An upgraded version, the Magic 2, replaced the original model in 1986. In total, 11,300 Magic 2s were produced; they were exported, notably to Iraq and Greece, who used them in combat.

The Magic is still carried by the Dassault Rafale, Dassault Mirage 2000, F-16, Sea Harrier (FRS51), MiG-21 Lancer, Super Étendard, Mirage F1, Mirage 5, and Mirage III. It is gradually being replaced by the MBDA MICA.

Four hundred and eighty were sold to Taiwan and used by the Republic of China Air Force.

PL-7 is the PRC version of the R.550 Magic.

Description 

The Magic has four fixed fins, four movable fins directly behind the fixed fins, and four notched fins on the tail, which is mounted on a bearing and is free to rotate independently of the missile.  This is in contrast with the AIM-9, which makes use of "rollerons," which are slipstream driven gyros mounted on the tail fins which stabilize the missile in three axes, and have no fixed fin "canards" forward of the moving fins.  Its diameter is larger than the Sidewinder's, which is 5 inches (127 mm) and a legacy of the US Navy's five-inch rocket, from which the AIM-9 is derived; the larger diameter simplified engineering.  It has a solid-fuel engine, and can engage the target independently from the firing aircraft with its passive infrared homing system.

The Magic 2 replaced the AD3601 seeking head by the all-aspect AD3633, allowing frontal fire on the target (the Magic 1 can only be fired from the rear on the target). The Magic 1 has a transparent dome on its nose, while the Magic 2 is opaque.

Operators

Current operators
 Magic 1 on Super Etendard

 Magic 2 on Mirage 2000

 Magic 2 on MiG-21 LanceR
 Magic 1 and 2 on Mirage 2000

Former operators
 Magic 1 on the Mirage IIIEA, Dagger, and Mirage 5P Mara
 Magic 1 on the Mirage IIIO
 Magic 2 on Mirage 2000B/C
 Magic 2 on Mirage F1
 Magic 1 and 2 on Mirage F1

 Magic 1 and 2 on Mirage F1

 Magic 1 on the Mirage F1
 on the Mirage 50

Operational history

Greece
On 8 October 1996, 7 months after the escalation over Imia/Kardak a Greek Mirage 2000 fired an R550 Magic II and shot down a Turkish F-16D over the Aegean Sea. The Turkish pilot died, while the co-pilot ejected and was rescued by Greek forces. In August 2012, after the downing of a Turkish RF-4E on the Syrian Coast, in response to a parliamentary question, Turkish Defence Minister İsmet Yılmaz confirmed that Turkish F-16D Block 40 (s/n 91-0023) of 192 Filo was shot down by a Greek Mirage 2000 with an R.550 Magic II on 8 October 1996 after violating Greek airspace near Chios island.

South Africa
The South African Air Force (SAAF) received a number of R.550 missiles before a widespread international arms embargo took effect in 1977. SAAF Mirage F1 aircraft carried the R.550. South African Mirage F1s fired early generation R550 missiles in combat over Angola against MiG-21 and MiG-23 adversaries on a number of occasions. In all but one case, the missiles failed to damage or destroy the MiGs. In an engagement between a Mirage F1CZ and MiG-21 in October 1982, two R.550s were fired by SAAF Major Rankin and one of them damaged the FAPLA MiG-21. The limited performance envelope of early generation R.550s led South Africa to begin developing an indigenous AAM called the V-3 Kukri.

See also
 PL-7 (Chinese version of R.550 Magic)
ASRAAM
IRIS-T
MBDA MICA
List of missiles

References
Citations

Bibliography
 

R.550
Matra
Military equipment introduced in the 1970s